Robert Overdo (fl. 1402) of Appleby-in-Westmorland, was an English politician.

Family
Overdo was probably the son or nephew of another Appleby MP, Robert Overdo.

Career
He was a Member (MP) of the Parliament of England for Appleby in 1402.

References

Year of birth missing
Year of death missing
English MPs 1402
Members of the Parliament of England (pre-1707) for Appleby